Sumer Sport Club is an Iraqi football team based in Al-Qādisiyyah, that plays in Iraq Division Three.

Stadium
In December 2018, Sumer Stadium was opened, and the opening witnessed a large crowd, and a match was held between Sumer and Al-Najma.

Managerial history
 Ali Ubayyes

See also 
 2021–22 Iraq Division Three

References

External links
 Iraq Clubs- Foundation Dates

2015 establishments in Iraq
Association football clubs established in 2015
Football clubs in Al-Qādisiyyah